The Škoda 16 T (also called Elektra) is a five carbody section low-floor uni-directional tram, developed by Škoda Transportation for Wrocław.

The vehicle was designed by Porsche Design Group. The 16 T has six axles, and the low-floor area represents 65% of the entire vehicle floor. It is based on the Škoda 05 T.

Production 
As of winter 2017, 17 trams were ordered and delivered to Wrocław. There were plans of buying additional 7 trams with the Škoda 19 T shipment, but all the plans have been canceled.

Equipment 
The Škoda 16 T is equipped according to all standards. The things that is missing alongside the Air-Conditioning is a Monitoring System. Due to this fact the back end of the tram has faced vandals, though it is not as badly damaged as the rear carriage of the Konstal 105NWr.

See also 
 Related models: 13 T (Brno), 14 T (Prague), 19 T (Wrocław bi-directional)

External links 

 Information on Škoda website
 List of vehicles (with basic data and photos) on Transport Database and Photogallery

Tram vehicles of Poland
Škoda trams

de:Škoda Elektra#16T für Breslau